Cow tree can refer to:
Brosimum utile in the family Moraceae, native to southern Central America and northern South America 
Couma macrocarpa in the family Apocynaceae, a tropical rain forest tree native to Colombia, also known as leche caspi and perillo negro
Gymnema lactiferum, Ceylon cow tree
Manilkara bidentata, also known as the Massaranduba tree, from Brazil

Oliver Tree’s alternate persona